Reykjavík University (RU) is the largest private university in Iceland with approximately 3,300 students (October 2020). It is chartered by the Chamber of Commerce, the Federation of Icelandic Industries, and the Confederation of Icelandic Employers. It should not be confused with the University of Iceland, which is also located in Reykjavík.

The university consists of seven academic departments in two schools. Within the School of Social Sciences are: the Department of Law, Department of Business Administration, Department of Sport Science, and Department of Psychology. Within the School of Technology are the Department of Computer Science, Department of Engineering, and Department of Applied Engineering. The university is bilingual (English and Icelandic).

History
Reykjavík University has its roots in the Commercial College of Iceland, School of Computer Science (TVÍ), which was founded in January 1988 and operated within the Commercial College of Iceland (VÍ) facilities for ten years.

Reykjavík University started its first semester on 1 September 1998, in a new building under the name Reykjavík School of Business. TVÍ became one of two departments within the school. A name change was inevitable because the school's name was not descriptive for the variety of the school's operations.

In January 2000, the name was changed to Reykjavík University. In the autumn of 2002, the School of Law was established at Reykjavík University and in 2005, Reykjavík University was merged with the Technical University of Iceland (THÍ) under the name Reykjavík University. Following the merger, the School of Science and Engineering was established, partly built upon the old foundation of THÍ with the addition of new engineering fields.

Administration
Ragnhildur Helgadóttir is the president of Reykjavik University, succeeding Ari Kristinn Jónsson in September 2021.

Academic schools and course offerings
The university features seven academic departments in two schools in which teaching and research is carried out:

School of Social Sciences
Department of Business Administration
Department of Law
Department of Sport Science
Department of Psychology

School of Technology
Department of Computer Science
Department of Engineering
Department of Applied Engineering

All departments offer a three-year study programme leading to a BSc or BA degree. All departments offer graduate programmes and PhD programmes taught in English. Reykjavik University also offers preliminary studies for students who need more preparation before beginning their university studies and an Open University with executive education courses for professionals.

Iceland School of Energy
Iceland School of Energy is operated within the School of Science and Engineering. The School offers opportunities for research, design and the management of systems for sustainable energy.

Research
Reykjavik University's research subjects are technology, business, and law. RU has participated in a formal implementation program of the European Commission policy regarding the working environment of researchers. In 2016, RU scientists published 245 articles, posters and abstracts in peer-reviewed conferences/symposia/ proceedings and 177 articles in peer-reviewed scholarly journals.

Campus
Reykjavik University operates in Nauthólsvík in a building that opened in January 2010. The structure of the building resembles the sun with its rays that extend from its core.

Partner institutions
Reykjavík University partners with many universities and companies in areas of research and education. For instance, it offers a double degree in computer science together with the University of Camerino. Students have the opportunity to enter exchange programmes through Nordplus and other partnership networks.

International accreditation

The university's Executive MBA program has been awarded 5-year accreditation by the London-based international accreditation organisation Association of MBAs (AMBA). The undergraduate programme in Business Studies has been awarded the EPAS accreditation. Several programmes within the School of Computer Science have been awarded an EQANIE accreditation.

See also
 Skemman.is (digital library)

References

External links
Homepage

 
Educational institutions established in 1998
1998 establishments in Iceland